Jens Jensen (15 November 1890 – 16 November 1957) was a Danish footballer. He played in one match for the Denmark national football team in 1920.

References

External links
 

1890 births
1957 deaths
Danish men's footballers
Denmark international footballers
People from Egedal Municipality
Association football midfielders
Boldklubben 1903 players
Sportspeople from the Capital Region of Denmark